Belgium was represented by Liliane Saint-Pierre, with the song "Soldiers of Love", at the 1987 Eurovision Song Contest, which took place on 9 may in Brussels, following Sandra Kim's victory for Belgium the previous year. Saint-Pierre was the winner of the Belgian national final for the contest, held on 14 March.

Before Eurovision

Eurosong '87 
Flemish broadcaster BRT was in charge of the selection of the Belgian entry for the 1987 Contest, while RTBF hosted the Eurovision Song Contest for Belgium due to their winning the previous year. The national final was held at the Amerikaans Theater in Brussels, hosted by Luc Appermont. Twelve singers had been invited to present a song in the selection, but Judith Vindevogel withdrew before the final, leaving eleven songs competing to become that year's Belgian entrant. Voting was by regional juries in the five Flemish provinces of Belgium, alongside a professional jury. Saint-Pierre emerged the winner by a 5-point margin, having been placed first by four of the regional juries (and second by the other), but being ranked only sixth by the professional jury.

Voting

At Eurovision 
On the night of the final Saint-Pierre performed 5th in the running order, following Iceland and preceding Sweden. At the close of the voting "Soldiers of Love" had received 56 points with votes from 12 countries (the highest mark being 8 from the United Kingdom), placing Belgium 11th out of 22 entries. The Belgian jury awarded its 12 points to contest winners Ireland.

Voting

References

External links 
 Belgian Preselection 1987

1987
Countries in the Eurovision Song Contest 1987
Eurovision